Freightos operates a booking and payments platform for international freight, using a SaaS-Enabled Marketplace model. It also provides rate management and quoting software for freight forwarders and carriers through WebCargo, a subsidiary acquired in 2016

The freightos.com online freight marketplace, which as first piloted in July 2016, enables online instant freight quoting and booking, as well as shipment management. The platform is also used by partners, like Alibaba.com. 

The company went public on Nasdaq with ticker symbol CRGO January 2023 by combining with the SPAC Gesher 1.

History
Freightos was founded in January 2012 by Zvi Schreiber. Schreiber has previously founded and managed other start-up companies including companies acquired by IBM and GE. The first beta customers of Freightos went live in October 2012 and the SaaS service was commercially launched in March 2013. Freightos raised initial funding from OurCrowd. Freightos is the trading name of Freightos Limited a Cayman Islands company (previously named Tradeos Limited, a Hong Kong company). Freightos has been a member of the Airforwarders Association since January 2013 and the International Air Cargo Association since 2021.

In August 2016, Freightos bought Spanish startup WebCargoNet, which later was marketed at WebCargo by Freightos. A similar, India-based air cargo rate management solution, Air Freight Bazaar, was acquired by the company in 2019.

In March 2017, Freightos raised $25 million in Series B funding led by GE Ventures bringing the company's total funding to $50 million.

In April 2018, Freightos launched a daily containerized index, called the Freightos Baltic Exchange Index. This is widely used as an indicator of global container prices. In 2021 Freightos launched the Freightos Air Index (FAX) of air cargo rates.

In September 2018, Freightos announced a $44.4 million dollar Series C funding round, led by the Singapore Exchange and together with previous investors, including Aleph and More VC. During the interview, Freightos founder Zvi Schreiber also mentioned the company's aspirations to connect carriers, like airlines, directly to forwarders and shippers.

In January 2021, Freightos announced the acquisition of 7L Freight, an air and trucking rate management software solution with a core customer base in the United States.

freightos.com overview
On July 26, 2016, Freightos launched one of the world's first online marketplaces for international freight, providing instant comparison, booking, and management of freight services from multiple logistics providers. Over time, a number of partnerships related to this endeavor were announced, including direct booking with CMA CGM, a top-five ocean liner.

WebCargo main features
WebCargo provides rate management including features for uploading freight pricing contracts in Excel, a database for freight rates, and a module for automatic freight and quotations on the Web. The quotation algorithm includes routing of door-to-door freight services. This supports exchanging quote requests and quotes between freight forwarders and their agents.

Since 2018, cargo airlines began to offer connectivity for air cargo pricing and booking. During these years WebCargo changed its business model to be primarily a booking platform, and the company claims to be the largest platform with which freight forwarders digitally book air cargo services with airlines. In July 2018, Lufthansa became the first airline to offer direct rates for forwarders on the platform. This was followed by additional airlines, including Air France–KLM in April 2019, IAG Cargo (British Airways and Iberia) in July 2019, SAS Cargo in November 2019, Etihad in February 2020, AirBridgeCargo in June 2020, Qatar Airways in January 2021, TAP Air Portugal Cargo in January 2021.

See also
 Zvi Schreiber

References

External links
 Official website
 Braun, Ted (May 2013). "Shipper Drives Change". Air cargo news 
 "FreightOS Announces Better Automation For Global Freight", http://www.manufacturing.net, 4 April 2013

Freight transport
2012 establishments in Hong Kong
Software companies of Israel
Companies based in Jerusalem